Lestock Graham DesBrisay (September 3, 1920 – 1988)  was a Canadian businessman and a politician in the Province of New Brunswick. He served as the Governor of the Atlantic Provinces Chambers of Commerce from 1958 through 1959.

DesBrisay was born in 1920 in Campbellton. Almost always referred to as "L.G. DesBrisay", in the 1960 New Brunswick general election, he was elected to the Legislative Assembly as the Liberal Party candidate in the Moncton City riding. He was immediately appointed by new Premier Louis Robichaud to the Cabinet as Minister of Finance.

Lestock G. DesBrisay was reelected in 1963 and on July 8 was given the additional responsibility for the Department of Industry, serving as its Minister until April 1, 1968. He was reelected again in 1967, continuing as Minister of Finance until his government was defeated in the 1970 general election.

Lestock Graham DesBrisay was a descendant of Captain Théophile de la Cour DesBrisay (1671–1761) whose Huguenot ancestors fled religious persecution in France and settled in Dublin, Ireland before coming to Canada.

References

 Genealogy of Lestock G. DesBrisay
 Government of New Brunswick, members of the Executive Council (PDF)

1920 births
1988 deaths
Businesspeople from New Brunswick
Members of the Executive Council of New Brunswick
People from Campbellton, New Brunswick
People from Moncton
Lestock Graham
New Brunswick Liberal Association MLAs
Finance ministers of New Brunswick